Raminho is a parish in the municipality of Angra do Heroísmo on the island of Terceira in the Azores. The population in 2011 was 565, in an area of 11.07 km². It consists of the localities Cabo do Raminho and Raminho.

References

External links
 http://www.acores.com/raminho

Freguesias of Angra do Heroísmo